Heinz Schenk (11 December 1924 – 1 May 2014) was a German television moderator and actor. He was born in Mainz.

Life 
Since 1951 Schenk worked for Hessischer Rundfunk as television moderator. In Germany he became famous for his television show Zum Blauen Bock. The show, which started under host Otto Höpfner, run under Schenk from 1966 to 1987. He died in Wiesbaden, aged 89.

References

External links 
 
 

German television personalities
German television presenters
German singer-songwriters
20th-century German musicians
1924 births
2014 deaths
Mass media people from Mainz
Officers Crosses of the Order of Merit of the Federal Republic of Germany
ARD (broadcaster) people
Hessischer Rundfunk people